The 2022 Chicago Fire FC II season will be the club's inaugural season, and their 1st season competing in MLS Next Pro, a professional developmental league in the third tier of the United States Soccer pyramid.

Players and staff

Current roster 
NOTE: First team players listed here have played in at least one game for the team.

Staff 
Ludovic Taillandier – Head Coach
Patrick Nyarko – Assistant Coach

Competitions

MLS NEXT Pro

Standings

Results summary

Regular season

See also 
2022 Chicago Fire FC season

References

Chicago Fire FC II
Chicago Fire FC II
Chicago Fire FC II